The Minotaur III, also known as OSP-2 Target Launch Vehicle, Peacekeeper TLV or OSP-2 TLV is an American rocket derived from the LGM-118 Peacekeeper missile. It is a member of the Minotaur family of rockets produced by Orbital Sciences Corporation, and is used for long range suborbital launches with heavy payloads.

Minotaur III rockets consist of four stages; the SR-118 first stage, SR-119 second stage and SR-120 third stage of a decommissioned Peacekeeper missile, with a Super-HAPS fourth stage, derived from the HAPS stage used on Pegasus and Minotaur I rockets. The Minotaur III is capable of launching a  payload  downrange on a suborbital trajectory.

Minotaur III launches will be conducted from Vandenberg Air Force Base and the Kodiak Launch Complex.

References

Minotaur (rocket family)